Francisco de la Cámara y Raya (died 18 August 1624) was a Roman Catholic prelate who served as Bishop of Panamá (1612–1624).

Biography
Francisco de la Cámara y Raya was born in Granada, Spain and ordained a priest in the Order of Preachers. On November 27, 1612, Pope Paul V, appointed him Bishop of Panamá. In 1614, he was consecrated bishop by Juan Bartolomé de Bohorquez e Hinojosa, Bishop of Coro. He served as Bishop of Panamá until his death on August 18, 1624.

References

External links and additional sources
 (for Chronology of Bishops) 
 (for Chronology of Bishops) 

1624 deaths
Bishops appointed by Pope Paul V
Dominican bishops
17th-century Roman Catholic bishops in Panama
People from Granada
Roman Catholic bishops of Panamá